The 32nd National Film Awards, presented by Directorate of Film Festivals, the organisation set up by Ministry of Information and Broadcasting, India to felicitate the best of Indian Cinema released in the year 1984. Ceremony took place in June 1985.

With 32nd National Film Awards, three more categories from feature films are awarded with Swarna Kamal (Golden Lotus) along with Best Feature Film, namely Best Debut Film of a Director, Best Popular Film Providing Wholesome Entertainment and Best Children's Film.

Also couple of new categories were introduced with 32nd National Film Awards for Best Supporting Actor, Best Supporting Actress, Best Costume Design and Best Film on Other Social Issues and awarded with Rajat Kamal (Silver Lotus). As per the Constitution of India, Best Feature Film in each of the languages other than those specified in schedule VIII of the constitution are also awarded with Rajat Kamal.

For Non-feature films section, a new award was introduced for Best Non-Feature Film and awarded with Swarna Kamal, for both, film producer and director.

For Best Writing on Cinema section, a new award was introduced for Best Film Critic and awarded with Rajat Kamal.

Awards 

Awards were divided into feature films, non-feature films and books written on Indian cinema.

Lifetime Achievement Award

Feature films 

Feature films were awarded at All India as well as regional level. For 32nd National Film Awards, a Hindi film, Damul won the National Film Award for Best Feature Film whereas a Malayalam film, Mukhamukham won the maximum number of awards (four). Following were the awards given in each category:

Juries 

A committee headed by Bhupen Hazarika was appointed to evaluate the feature films awards. Following were the jury members:

 Jury Members
 Bhupen Hazarika (Chairperson)Sharmila TagoreT. V. Kunni KrishnanAjay Kumar DeyManmohan TalkhBharathirajaUsha BhagatGirish KasaravalliBhimsenG. Hanumant Rao

All India Award 

Following were the awards given:

Golden Lotus Award 

Official name: Swarna Kamal

All the awardees are awarded with 'Golden Lotus Award (Swarna Kamal)', a certificate and cash prize.

Silver Lotus Award 

Official name: Rajat Kamal

All the awardees are awarded with 'Golden Lotus Award (Swarna Kamal)', a certificate and cash prize.

Regional Awards 

The award is given to best film in the regional languages in India.

Best Feature Film in Each of the Language Other Than Those Specified In the Schedule VIII of the Constitution

Non-Feature films 

Short Films made in any Indian language and certified by the Central Board of Film Certification as a documentary/newsreel/fiction are eligible for non-feature film section.

Juries 

A committee headed by V. K. Murthy was appointed to evaluate the non-feature films awards. Following were the jury members:

 Jury Members
 V. K. Murthy (Chairperson)Shanta Sabarjeet SinghAshish MukherjeeJ. P. Das

Golden Lotus Award 
Official name: Swarna Kamal

Silver Lotus Award 
Official name: Rajat Kamal

All the awardees are awarded with 'Silver Lotus Award (Rajat Kamal)' and cash prize.

Best Writing on Cinema 

The awards aim at encouraging study and appreciation of cinema as an art form and dissemination of information and critical appreciation of this art-form through publication of books, articles, reviews etc.

Juries 

A committee headed by Vikram Singh was appointed to judge the writing on Indian cinema. Following were the jury members:

 Jury Members
 Vikram Singh (Chairperson)Muhammad ShameemJagmohan

Silver Lotus Award 
Official name: Rajat Kamal

All the awardees are awarded with 'Silver Lotus Award (Rajat Kamal)' and cash prize.

References

External links 
 National Film Awards Archives
 Official Page for Directorate of Film Festivals, India

National Film Awards (India) ceremonies
1984 Indian film awards